The 1902 Maryland Aggies football team represented Maryland Agricultural College (later part of the University of Maryland) in the 1902 college football season. In their first season under head coach D. John Markey, the Aggies compiled a 3–5–2 record and were outscored by their opponents, 90 to 28. On October 22, 1902, the team secured its first victory in four years in an intercollegiate football game, defeating Columbian University (later known as George Washington University) by an 11–10 score.

Schedule

References

Maryland
Maryland Terrapins football seasons
Maryland Aggies football